Chak no 7/p,is a large village in the Khanpur tehsil in the Punjab province of Pakistan. It is located near Cholistan and the Aab-e-Hayat Canal. Cholistan Cadet College is near Chak no 7/p. Locals belong to the Arain tribe and speak the Punjabi language. Exports include crops like sugarcane and wheat.

The 7/p is a center for sugarcane and cotton agriculture. It is one of the largest villages of the Rahim Yar Khan District, in terms of its area. The famous Cholistan Desert is mainly located in the near 7/p area. The people of Chak 7/p are very honest loyal and hardworking.

Education

People of Chak no 7/p are well educated. There is two Govt School one health center, one veterinary hospital, and many private institutes. All the institutes show the standard of living and strategic planning by the leadership of Chak 7/p.

History

In 712 CE, Sultan Muhammad bin Qasim came in India. The Punjab region became predominantly Muslim due to missionary Sufi saints whose dargahs dot the landscape of Punjab region.people of 7/p become mostly from central Punjab.

Agriculture

Agriculture is the main livelihood of 7/p's residents. The major crops grown in the region are cotton, sugarcane, wheat, rice, fruits, and vegetables. Vegetables, especially carrots, are very famous in the winter season and are 7/p. Although 7/p was originally a major cotton-growing area, it has now shifted towards being a major sugarcane growing region. The average yield of the sugarcane crop is 748.15 Mnds/Acre (2011–12), which is greater than the average yield of the world and Pakistan. Vegetables are grown widely in scattered areas, and the number of greenhouses is increasing every year.

Notable people

Below is a list of people who are known for their association with 7/p, Pakistan. It does not necessarily mean that they were born in the city or were even nationals of the country.

Ch Muhammad Arshad Politician (members of Punjab assembly)
Ch Muhammad Ijaz Shafi
Muhammad Usman Ghani

References

Villages in Rahim Yar Khan District